Carpathonesticus racovitzai  is an araneomorph spider species of the family Nesticidae. It occurs in Romania, where it can be found both in caves and outdoors. It was transferred from the genus Nesticus to Carpathonesticus in 1982 by Weiss and Heimer.

Description
Females have an unpatterned prosoma with a reddish yellow sternum and appendages. The prosoma length is 2.3 mm. The eyes are ringed brown. The opisthosoma is unpatterned.
Males have a prosoma length of 2.2 mm. The eyes are ringed blackish brown.

Original publication

References 

Nesticidae
Spiders of Europe
Spiders described in 1980